Robert Kendrick and Travis Rettenmaier were the defending champions but Kendrick decided not to participate.
Rettenmaier played alongside Simon Stadler, losing in the first round.
Carsten Ball and Chris Guccione won the title, defeating Steve Johnson and Sam Querrey 6–1, 5–7, [10–6] in the final.

Seeds

Draw

Draw

References
 Main Draw
 Qualifying Draw

Royal Bank of Scotland Challenger - Doubles
2011 Doubles